John Peter Cronan (born 1976) is an American lawyer serving as a United States district judge of the United States District Court for the Southern District of New York. He was formerly acting United States assistant attorney general for the United States Department of Justice Criminal Division.

Education 

Cronan earned his Bachelor of Arts, magna cum laude, from Georgetown University, where he was inducted into Phi Beta Kappa, and his Juris Doctor from Yale Law School.

Career 

After graduating from law school, Cronan served as a law clerk to Judge Barrington D. Parker Jr. on both the United States District Court for the Southern District of New York and the United States Court of Appeals for the Second Circuit. He later clerked for Judge Robert Katzmann of the United States Court of Appeals for the Second Circuit. Cronan was an Assistant United States Attorney for the Southern District of New York, where he supervised the Terrorism and International Narcotics Unit and served in the Office's Civil Division. He previously served as the acting United States Assistant Attorney General for the United States Department of Justice Criminal Division from November 2017 to July 2018. Immediately before becoming a judge, Cronan was the Principal Deputy Assistant Attorney General for the Criminal Division. Cronan was previously an adjunct professor at New York University School of Law, where he co-taught a seminar on federal criminal prosecutions.

Federal judicial service 

On November 6, 2019, President Donald Trump announced his intent to nominate Cronan to serve as a United States district judge of the United States District Court for the Southern District of New York. On December 2, 2019, his nomination was sent to the Senate. President Trump nominated Cronan to the seat vacated by Judge William H. Pauley III, who assumed senior status on March 1, 2018. On January 3, 2020, his nomination was returned to the President under Rule XXXI, Paragraph 6 of the Senate. On February 27, 2020, his renomination was sent to the Senate. On March 4, 2020, a hearing on his nomination was held before the Senate Judiciary Committee. On May 14, 2020, his nomination was reported out of committee by a 12–10 vote. On August 6, 2020, the Senate invoked cloture on his nomination by a 55–42 vote. His nomination was confirmed later that day by a 55–42 vote. He received his judicial commission on August 10, 2020.

Memberships 

Cronan has been a member of the Federalist Society since 2017. Since 1998, he has been an inactive member of Phi Beta Kappa.

References

External links 
 

|-

1976 births
Living people
21st-century American lawyers
21st-century American judges
Assistant United States Attorneys
Federalist Society members
Georgetown University alumni
Judges of the United States District Court for the Southern District of New York
Lawyers from New York City
New York (state) lawyers
New York University School of Law faculty
People from Teaneck, New Jersey
Trump administration personnel
United States Assistant Attorneys General for the Criminal Division
United States Department of Justice lawyers
United States district court judges appointed by Donald Trump
Yale Law School alumni